was a troop transport that served in the United States Navy from 1918 to 1920 and was briefly in commission as  in 1918 and 1920. She was better known in her role as passenger liner , one of the premier West Coast steamships operated by the Los Angeles Steamship Company.

Construction
The passenger ship SS Harvard was built in 1907 for the Metropolitan Steamship Company as Yard No. 334 by the Delaware River Iron Shipbuilding and Engine Works at Chester, Pennsylvania, following her sister-ship Yale. She was launched on 30 January 1907 and entered service the following month.

The ship was driven by triple screw propellers, each powered by a steam turbine made by W. & A. Fletcher Company of Hoboken, New Jersey, which gave her a service speed of  knots.

Naval service
The U.S. Navy commandeered her on 21 March 1918 for World War I service, assigned her the registry Identification Number (Id. No.) 1298, outfitted her for service as a troop transport at Mare Island Navy Yard at Vallejo, California, and commissioned her as USS Harvard (ID-1298) on 9 April 1918. On 11 April 1918 she was renamed USS Charles (ID-1298).  The Navy later (on 28 August 1918) purchased Charles outright from her owners.

Departing Mare Island, Charles reached Hampton Roads, Virginia, on 26 June 1918. There she loaded troops and departed Newport News, Virginia, for Brest, France, on 10 July 1918. She arrived at Brest on 21 July 1918.

On 27 July 1918, Charles reported at Southampton, England, for duty as a ferry for troops crossing the English Channel. She made about 60 voyages between Southampton and Le Havre or Boulogne, France, carrying troops of all nationalities bound for action at the front during the war or for occupation duty after it ended, until 5 May 1919.

Her ferrying duties completed, Charles embarked passengers at Rotterdam in the Netherlands and at Brest for transportation to the United States, and on 15 June 1919, arrived at New York City. Her support of United States Army operations in Europe at an end, Charles arrived at the Philadelphia Navy Yard at Philadelphia, Pennsylvania on 24 July 1919, and was decommissioned there on 10 June 1920.

Return to civil use
Reverting to her original name, Charles was renamed USS Harvard on 29 July 1920. She was considered for conversion into a seaplane tender, but this was never carried out, and instead she was sold on 14 October 1920.

Wreck
Once again SS Harvard resumed commercial service, however she was stranded and wrecked at Point Arguello, California, on 30 May 1931.

Notes

References

Department of the Navy: Naval Historical Center Online Library of Selected Images: U.S. Navy Ships: USS Charles (ID # 1298), 1918–1920. Briefly named Harvard in 1918 and 1920. Originally, and later, S.S. Harvard (American Coastal Passenger Ship, 1907)
NavSource Online: Section Patrol Craft Photo Archive: Charles (ID 1298) ex-Harvard

External links
 Background and images related to this ship and her loss.

World War I transports of the United States
Transports of the United States Navy
1907 ships
Ships built by the Delaware River Iron Ship Building and Engine Works
Shipwrecks in the Pacific Ocean
Maritime incidents in 1931